Sergey Nikolaevich Dolidovich (born 18 May 1973 in Orsha) is a Belarusian cross-country skier who has competed since 1994. His lone World Cup victory was in a 60 km event in Finland in 2001.

Dolidovich also competed in six Winter Olympics, earning his best finish of 5th in the 50 km event at Sochi in 2014, at the age of 40. His best finish at the FIS Nordic World Ski Championships was fourth in the 30 km pursuit at Oslo in 2011.

World Cup results
All results are sourced from the International Ski Federation (FIS).

Individual podiums
1 victory 
2 podiums

References

External links
 
 
 

People from Orsha
1973 births
Belarusian male cross-country skiers
Tour de Ski skiers
Cross-country skiers at the 1994 Winter Olympics
Cross-country skiers at the 1998 Winter Olympics
Cross-country skiers at the 2002 Winter Olympics
Cross-country skiers at the 2006 Winter Olympics
Cross-country skiers at the 2010 Winter Olympics
Cross-country skiers at the 2014 Winter Olympics
Cross-country skiers at the 2018 Winter Olympics
Living people
Olympic cross-country skiers of Belarus
Universiade medalists in cross-country skiing
Universiade silver medalists for Belarus
Competitors at the 1997 Winter Universiade
Competitors at the 1999 Winter Universiade
Sportspeople from Vitebsk Region